Gokak Falls  is a town in Belagavi district in the Indian state of Karnataka. It is under the control of municipal corporation Konnur, Karnataka.

Demographics
 India census, Gokak Falls had a population of 10,042. Males constitute 51% of the population and females 49%. Gokak Falls has an average literacy rate of 73%, higher than the national average of 59.5%: male literacy is 81%, and female literacy is 64%. In Gokak Falls, 12% of the population is under 6 years of age.

The Forbes Academy is the only English language school in Gokak Falls. Along with Volkart Academy as Kannada, Marathi and Urdu Language.

References

Villages in Belagavi district